The T71 Experimental Airborne Light Tank was part of a 1952 plan by the US to replace the M41 Walker Bulldog in service. It was equipped with a primary oscillating turret. It was similar to the AMX-13 and the T92 Light Tank. By 1953, there were 3 designs that were suggested as a replacement. Those 3 designs were drawn by Detroit Arsenal, Cadillac, and Aircraft Armaments.

History
In 1952, the Army Ordnance Committee gave general required characteristics for a replacement of the M41 Walker Bulldog. Originally, there was a 20 ton maximum weight and a requirement for a 90 mm gun. This requirement was later changed to an 18-ton weight limit and a 76 millimeter gun which would have allowed a quicker replacement of the barrel.

Design
It had an oscillating turret and a second turret mounted on the previous turret; the first turret had the primary armament of a 76mm M1A2 or a 76mm T185; the second "mini turret" had a secondary armament of an American GPMG. Separated suspension wheels made it easier to cross difficult terrain. It was proposed to serve as an armed reconnaissance vehicle, only aided in its endeavours by the tank's light weight and therefore faster speeds.

Main armament
The T71 had a choice between two guns, the 76mm M1A2 or a 76mm T185. Both guns used an auto-loading system, which benefit from light-weighted, low-profile, higher rate of fire, and fewer crew members. However, that meant that the commander and the gunner would have had to manually load the magazine after expending the shells in the magazine, leaving the vehicle very vulnerable while reloading. The relatively small caliber of the gun also was rather ineffective against thick armor, such as the Russian heavy tank series "IS".

References

Light tanks of the United States
Cold War tanks of the United States
Light tanks of the Cold War
Tanks with autoloaders
Abandoned military projects of the United States
Trial and research tanks of the United States